The Holman rule is a rule in the United States House of Representatives that allows amendments to appropriations legislation that would reduce the salary of or fire specific federal employees, or cut a specific program. Versions of the rule were in effect during 1876–1895 and again during 1911–1983.

It was reinstated for the Republican-controlled 115th Congress during 2017–2019, and several amendments were proposed that progressed to a vote of the full House, but none were adopted.  The rule was rescinded once more at the beginning of the 116th Congress upon Democrats taking control of the chamber, and was restored once Republicans retook the House majority for the 118th Congress in 2023.

Effects 
The rule is an exception to the prohibition against provisions in appropriations legislation that change existing law.  Prior to the rule's reinstatement in 2017, cuts could be made to agencies broadly, but not to specific programs or employees, and it appeared never to have been used to cut a specific worker's salary with the intent of incentivizing them to quit.  The rule cannot be used if the reductions are contingent on other events, or to give broad authority to agency heads to fire workers.

The constitutionality of bills passed under the Holman rule has been questioned by legal scholars in light of the U.S. Supreme Court's ruling in United States v. Lovett (1946). That case dealt with an act of Congress, passed during the Red Scare's McCarthyism, that defunded the salaries of 39 employees accused of having Communist sympathies. The Court held that, under these circumstances, the Act was no "mere appropriation measure", but was effectively a bill of attainder prohibited by Article I, Section 9, of the Constitution.

History

19th century 
The rule was first passed in 1876, and rescinded in 1895.  Its text underwent several modifications during this time.  It was named for Indiana Representative William S. Holman. It was initially used to eliminate patronage positions prior to the establishment of the merit-based employment system.

20th century 
The rule was restored in 1911. This iteration of the Holman rule was part of Rule XXI, Clause 2 of the Rules of the House of Representatives, and stated that an amendment to an appropriations bill is allowed if it, "being germane to the subject matter of the bill, shall retrench expenditures by the reduction of the number and salary of the officers of the United States, by the reduction of the compensation of any person paid out of the Treasury of the United States, or by the reduction of amounts of money covered by the bill".  Its text did not change before it was rescinded.

During this time it was used for targeted cuts to, and caps on, the number and salary of federal employees, though its use was rare in modern times.  The rule was used to eliminate 29 customs positions in 1932 and another eight in 1939, to allow a provision reducing the number of naval officers in 1938, and to allow a 1952 amendment disallowing the filling of vacancies in independent agencies until the agency's workforce had been reduced by 10%.

It was removed in 1983 due to objections from Speaker of the House Tip O'Neill.

2017–2019 revival 
The rule was reinstated as part of the rules package enacted at the beginning of the 115th Congress in 2017 for a period of one year, unless extended by Congress.  The 2017 reinstatement of the law was a standing order not incorporated into the main body of the Rules of the House.  It allowed during the 115th Congress "any provision or amendment ... that retrenches expenditures by—(1) the reduction of amounts of money in the bill; (2) the reduction of the number and salary of the officers of the United States; or (3) the reduction of the compensation of any person paid out of the Treasury of the United States."

It was championed by Freedom Caucus member Morgan Griffith, Republican of Virginia, who favored empowering individual members of Congress to strategically reassign workers according to policy needs, and to cut programs perceived as wasteful. Republicans said that the rule change would increase accountability and streamline the appropriations process, and said they did not intend it as a broad change to the appropriations process.

Democrats criticized the revival of the Holman rule as undermining civil service protections, and allowing the possibility that specific individuals could be targeted for political reasons. Federal employee unions, such as the American Federation of Government Employees, raised similar concerns. The rule was also criticized for taking hiring decisions out of the hands of Cabinet and other members of the executive branch.  Some Republicans also criticized the rule, such as Tom Cole, chairman of a House Appropriations Subcommittee.

There were several attempts to use the rule in 2017 as amendments to the fiscal year 2018 appropriations bills. A proposal offered by Morgan Griffith to eliminate 89 jobs at the Congressional Budget Office failed on July 26, 2017, on a vote of 116–309.  There were also two additional amendments offered by Ron DeSantis that were approved by the House Rules Committee but did not receive a floor vote: one aimed at employees working on Guantanamo Bay Naval Base policy, as well as one for a single individual at the Army Corps of Engineers.

The Holman rule was extended to the end of the 115th Congress in March 2018. In April 2018, the Republican Study Committee budget plan supported use of the rule to remove positions considered unneeded. In June 2018, Paul Gosar proposed using the rule to cut the Western Area Power Administration Administrator Mark Gabriel's salary to $1 for alleged misconduct.  This amendment failed by a vote of 139–276 on June 7, 2018.

The Holman rule was removed at the beginning of the 116th Congress in January 2019, after Democrats had taken control of the chamber.

2023 revival 
Following the 2022 midterms, the House Republican majority supported and adopted rules for the 118th Congress reinstating the Holman rule.

See also 
 Procedures of the United States House of Representatives

References 

1876 in American law
United States House of Representatives
Parliamentary procedure